According to the Roman historian Livy,  Jupiter Indiges is the name given to the deified hero Aeneas. In some versions of his story, he is raised up to become a god after his death by Numicus, a local deity of the river of the same name, at the request of Aeneas' mother Venus. The title Pater Indiges or simply Indiges is also used.

The Greek historian Dionysius of Halicarnassus notes that when the body of Aeneas was not found after a battle between his group of Trojan exiles in Italy and the native Rutulians, it was assumed that he had been taken up by the gods to become a deity. He also presents the alternative explanation that Aeneas may have simply drowned in the river Numicus and that a shrine in his memory was built there.

The term "Indiges", thought by some to be from the same root as "indigenous", may reflect the fact that these minor deities (collectively, the Di indigetes) originated locally in Italy. An alternate explanation is that they were individuals who were raised to the status of gods after mortal life. Compare for example Sol Indiges.

References

Roman gods
Jupiter (mythology)